This is a list of notable individuals and organizations who have voiced their endorsement of Joe Biden's campaign for the Democratic Party's nomination for the 2020 U.S. presidential election before he became the presumptive nominee on April 8.

Federal legislative officials

Former federal officials

Cabinet-level officials 

 Madeleine Albright, U.S. Secretary of State (1997–2001), U.S. Ambassador to the United Nations (1993–1997)
 Erskine Bowles, President of the University of North Carolina System (2005–2010), 2004 and 2002 nominee for Senate, Administrator of the Small Business Administration (1993–1994), White House Chief of Staff (1997–1998), White House Deputy Chief of Staff for Operations (1994–1996)
 Henry Cisneros, U.S. Secretary of Housing and Urban Development (1993–1997), Mayor of San Antonio, TX (1981–1989) (previously endorsed Julian Castro)
 James Clapper, Director of National Intelligence (2010–2017), Under Secretary of Defense for Intelligence (2007–2010), Director of the National Geospatial-Intelligence Agency (2001–2006), Director of the Defense Intelligence Agency (1991–1995)
 Tom Donilon, National Security Advisor (2010–2013), Deputy National Security Advisor (2009–2010)
 Mike Espy, U.S. Secretary of Agriculture (1993–1994), 2020 and 2018 nominee for Senate, U.S. Representative from MS-02 (1987–1993)
 Anthony Foxx, U.S. Secretary of Transportation (2013–2017), Mayor of Charlotte, NC (2009–2013)
 Michael Froman, U.S. Trade Representative (2013–2017)
 Chuck Hagel, U.S. Secretary of Defense (2013–2015), U.S. Senator from Nebraska (1997–2009) (Republican)
 John Kerry, U.S. Secretary of State (2013–2017), U.S. Senator from Massachusetts (1985–2013), Chair of the Senate Foreign Relations Committee (2009–2013), Chair (2007–2009, 2001–2003) and Ranking Member (2003–2007) of the Senate Small Business Committee, Lieutenant Governor of Massachusetts (1983–1985), 2004 nominee for president
 Ray LaHood, U.S. Secretary of Transportation (2009–2013), U.S. Representative from IL–18 (1995–2009) (Republican)
 Jack Lew, U.S. Secretary of the Treasury (2013–2017), White House Chief of Staff (2012–2013), Director of the Office of Management and Budget (2010–2012, 1998–2001)
 Gary Locke, U.S. Ambassador to China (2011–2014), U.S. Secretary of Commerce (2009–2011), Governor of Washington (1997–2005)
 Denis McDonough, White House Chief of Staff (2013–2017), Deputy National Security Advisor (2010–2013)
 Norman Mineta, U.S. Secretary of Transportation (2001–2006), U.S. Secretary of Commerce (2000–2001), U.S. Representative from CA-15 (1993–1995) and CA-13 (1975–1993), Chair (1993–1995) and Ranking Member (1995) of the House Transportation Committee, Chair of the Congressional Asian Pacific American Caucus (1994–1995)
 Janet Napolitano, President of the University of California System (2013–present), U.S. Secretary of Homeland Security (2009–2013), Governor of Arizona (2003–2009), Chair of National Governors Association (2006–2007)
 Leon Panetta, U.S. Secretary of Defense (2011–2013), CIA Director (2009–2011), White House Chief of Staff (1994–1997), OMB Director (1993–1994), U.S. Representative from CA-16 (1977–1993), Chair of the House Budget Committee (1989–1993)
 Federico Peña, U.S. Secretary of Energy (1997–1998), U.S. Secretary of Transportation (1993–1997), Mayor of Denver, CO (1983–1991)
 Samantha Power, U.S. Ambassador to the United Nations (2013–2017)
 Penny Pritzker, U.S. Secretary of Commerce (2013–2017), National Finance Chair of the Barack Obama 2008 presidential campaign (2007–2008)
 Susan Rice, U.S. National Security Advisor (2013–2017), U.S. Ambassador to the United Nations (2009–2013), Assistant Secretary of State for African Affairs (1997–2001)
 Richard Riley, U.S. Secretary of Education (1993–2001), Governor of South Carolina (1979–1987)
 Ken Salazar, U.S. Secretary of the Interior (2009–2013), U.S. Senator from Colorado (2005–2009)
 Kathleen Sebelius, U.S. Secretary of Health and Human Services (2009–2014), Governor of Kansas (2003–2009)
 Donna Shalala, U.S. Representative from FL-27 (2019–present), President of the Clinton Foundation (2015–2017), President of the University of Miami (2001–2015), U.S. Secretary of Health and Human Services (1993–2001)
 Hilda Solis, U.S. Secretary of Labor (2009–2013), U.S. Representative from CA-32 (2001–2009)
 Tom Vilsack, U.S. Secretary of Agriculture (2009–2017), Governor of Iowa (1999–2007)
 Andrew Young, Mayor of Atlanta, GA (1982–1990), U.S. Ambassador to the United Nations (1977–1979), U.S. Representative from GA-05 (1973–1977)

White House officials 

 Nelson Cunningham, Senior Advisor to the Special Envoy for the Americas
 Avril Haines, Deputy National Security Advisor (2015–2017), Deputy Director of the Central Intelligence Agency (2013–2015)
 Colin Kahl, National Security Advisor to the Vice President (2014–2017)
 Chris Kojm, Chair of the National Intelligence Council (2009–2014)
 Lisa Monaco, Homeland Security Advisor (2013–2017)
 Steve Ricchetti, White House Deputy Chief of Staff for Operations (1998–2001) (National Chair)
 Anthony Scaramucci, White House Communications Director (2017) (Republican)
 Jake Sullivan, National Security Advisor to the Vice President (2013–2014)

State Department officials 

 Tony Blinken, Deputy Secretary of State (2015–2017), Deputy National Security Advisor (2013–2015)
 Reuben Brigety, Deputy Assistant Secretary of State for African Affairs (2011–2013)
 R. Nicholas Burns, Under Secretary of State for Political Affairs (2005–2008)
 Kurt M. Campbell, Assistant Secretary of State for East Asian and Pacific Affairs (2009–2013)
 Elinor Constable, Assistant Secretary of State for Oceans and International Environmental and Scientific Affairs (1993–1995), U.S. Ambassador to Kenya (1986–1989)
 Evan Dobelle, Chief of Protocol (1977–1978)
 Jeffrey D. Feltman, Under Secretary General of the United Nations for Political Affairs (2012–2018), Assistant Secretary of State for Near Eastern Affairs (2009–2012), U.S. Ambassador to Lebanon (2004–2008)
 Jose W. Fernandez, Assistant Secretary of State for Economic and Business Affairs (2009–2013)
 Jon Finer, Director of Policy Planning (2016–2017)
 Douglas Frantz, Assistant Secretary of State for Public Affairs (2013–2015)
 Robert S. Gelbard, U.S. Ambassador to Indonesia (1999–2001), Assistant Secretary of State for International Narcotics Matters (1993–1997), U.S. Ambassador to Bolivia (1988–1991)
 Heather Higginbottom, Deputy Secretary of State for Management and Resources (2013–2017), Counselor of the Department of State (2013), Deputy Director of the Office of Management and Budget (2011–2013)
 Christopher R. Hill, Assistant Secretary of State for East Asian and Pacific Affairs (2005–2009), U.S. Ambassador to Iraq (2009–2010), U.S. Ambassador to South Korea (2004–2005), U.S. Ambassador to Poland (2000–2004), U.S. Ambassador to Macedonia (1996–1999), U.S. Ambassador to Albania (1991)
 Roberta S. Jacobson, Assistant Secretary of State for Western Hemisphere Affairs (2011–2016), U.S. Ambassador to Mexico (2016–2018)
 Barbara Larkin, Assistant Secretary of State for Legislative Affairs (1996–2001)
 Suzanne Nossel, Deputy Assistant Secretary of State for International Organization Affairs (2009)
 Victoria Nuland, Assistant Secretary of State for European and Eurasian Affairs (2013–2017), Spokesperson for the Department of State (2011–2013), U.S. Ambassador to NATO (2005–2008)
 Anne W. Patterson, Assistant Secretary of State for Near Eastern Affairs (2013–2017), U.S. Ambassador to Egypt (2011–2013), U.S. Ambassador to Pakistan (2007–2010), Acting U.S. Ambassador to the United Nations (2005), Assistant Secretary of State for International Narcotics and Law Enforcement Affairs (2005–2007), U.S. Ambassador to Colombia (2000–2003), U.S. Ambassador to El Salvador (1997–2000)
 Peter A. Selfridge, Chief of Protocol (2014–2017)
 Jay T. Snyder, Commissioner of the U.S. Advisory Commission on Public Diplomacy
 Linda Thomas-Greenfield, Assistant Secretary of State for African Affairs (2013–2017), Director General of the Foreign Service (2012–2013), U.S. Ambassador to Liberia (2008–2012)
 Arturo Valenzuela, Assistant Secretary of State for Western Hemisphere Affairs (2009–2011)
 Nicholas A. Veliotes, Assistant Secretary of State for Near Eastern and South Asian Affairs (1981–1983), U.S. Ambassador to Egypt (1984–1986), U.S. Ambassador to Jordan (1978–1981)
 Richard Verma, Assistant Secretary of State for Legislative Affairs (2009–2011), U.S. Ambassador to Egypt (2015–2017)
 Edward S. Walker Jr., Assistant Secretary of State for Near Eastern Affairs (2000–2001), U.S. Ambassador to Israel (1997–2000), U.S. Ambassador to Egypt (1994–1997), U.S. Ambassador to the United Arab Emirates (1989–1992)

U.S. Ambassadors 

 Leslie M. Alexander, U.S. Ambassador to Ecuador (1996–1999), U.S. Ambassador to Mauritius and the Comoros (1994–1996), U.S. Ambassador to Haiti (1992–1993)
 Robert L. Barry, U.S. Ambassador to Indonesia (1992–1995), U.S. Ambassador to Bulgaria (1981–1984)
 Matthew Barzun, U.S. Ambassador to the United Kingdom (2013–2017), U.S. Ambassador to Sweden (2009–2011)
 Denise Bauer, U.S. Ambassador to Belgium (2013–2017)
 Jack R. Binns, U.S. Ambassador to Honduras (1980–1981)
 Alan Blinken, U.S. Ambassador to Belgium (1993–1997)
 Wally Brewster, U.S. Ambassador to the Dominican Republic (2013–2017)
 Reuben Brigety, U.S. Ambassador to the African Union (2013–2015), Dean of the Elliott School of International Affairs (2015–present)
 Tim Broas, U.S. Ambassador to the Netherlands (2014–2016)
 Mark Brzezinski, U.S. Ambassador to Sweden (2011–2015)
 Dwight L. Bush Sr., U.S. Ambassador to Morocco (2014–2017)
 Mark B. Childress, U.S. Ambassador to Tanzania (2014–2016)
 Isobel Coleman, U.S. Ambassador to the United Nations for Management and Reform (2014–2017)
 James Costos, U.S. Ambassador to Spain and Andorra (2013–2017) 
 Jeffrey DeLaurentis, U.S. Ambassador to Cuba (2014–2017), U.S. Ambassador to the United Nations for Special Political Affairs (2011–2014)
 Greg Delawie, U.S. Ambassador to Kosovo (2015–2018)
 William Eacho, U.S. Ambassador to Austria (2009–2013)
 Gerald Feierstein, U.S. Ambassador to Yemen (2010–2013)
 Elizabeth Bagley, U.S. Ambassador to Portugal (1994–1997)
 Anthony L. Gardner, U.S. Ambassador to the European Union (2014–2017)
 Rufus Gifford, U.S. Ambassador to Denmark (2013–2017)
 Marc Ginsberg, U.S. Ambassador to Morocco (1994–1998)
 Mark Gitenstein, U.S. Ambassador to Romania (2009–2012)
 Christopher E. Goldthwait, U.S. Ambassador to Chad (1999–2004)
 Gary A. Grappo U.S. Ambassador to Oman (2006–2009)
 Gabriel Guerra-Mondragón, U.S. Ambassador to Chile (1994–1998)
 Nina Hachigian, U.S. Ambassador to the Association of Southeast Asian Nations (2014–2017)
 Jane D. Hartley, U.S. Ambassador to France and Monaco (2014–2017)
 Karl W. Hofmann, U.S. Ambassador to Togo (2000–2002)
 Thomas C. Hubbard, U.S. Ambassador to South Korea (2001–2004), U.S. Ambassador to the Philippines (1996–2000)
 Vicki J. Huddleston, U.S. Ambassador to Mali (2000–2005), U.S. Ambassador to Madagascar (1995–1996)
 Deborah K. Jones, U.S. Ambassador to Libya (2013–2015), U.S. Ambassador to Kuwait (2008–2011)
 Richard Kauzlarich, U.S. Ambassador to Bosnia and Herzegovina (1997–1999), U.S. Ambassador to Azerbaijan (1994–1997)
 Caroline Kennedy, U.S. Ambassador to Japan (2013–2017)
 Lisa Kubiske. U.S. Ambassador to Honduras (2011–2014)
 Mark P. Lagon, U.S. Ambassador-at-Large to Monitor and Combat Trafficking in Persons (2007–2009)
 David Lambertson, U.S. Ambassador to Thailand (1991–1995)
 Doug Lute, U.S. Ambassador to NATO (2013–2017)
 R. Niels Marquardt, U.S. Ambassador to Madagascar and the Comoros (2007–2010), U.S. Ambassador to Equatorial Guinea (2004–2006), U.S. Ambassador to Cameroon (2001–2004)
 Elizabeth McKune, U.S. Ambassador to Qatar (1998–2001)
 Christopher McMullen, U.S. Ambassador to Angola (2010–2013)
 Tom Miller, U.S. Ambassador to Greece (2001–2004), U.S. Ambassador to Bosnia and Herzegovina (1999–2001)
 Richard Morningstar, U.S. Ambassador to Azerbaijan (2012–2015)
 Lyndon Olson, U.S. Ambassador to Sweden (1998–2001)
 Kevin O'Malley, U.S. Ambassador to Ireland (2014–2017)
 Robert Orr, U.S. Ambassador to the Asian Development Bank (2010–2016), President of Boeing Japan (2002–2007)
 June Carter Perry, U.S. Ambassador to Lesotho and to Sierra Leone (2004–2007)
 Joan M. Plaisted, U.S. Ambassador to Kiribati and to the Marshall Islands (1995–2000), U.S. Ambassador to Morocco (1991–1994)
 Michael C. Polt, U.S. Ambassador to Estonia (2009–2012), U.S. Ambassador to Serbia (2006–2007), U.S. Ambassador to Serbia and Montenegro (2004–2006), Acting Assistant Secretary of State for Legislative Affairs (2001)
 Azita Raji, U.S. Ambassador to Sweden (2016–2017)
 Charles A. Ray, U.S. Ambassador to Zimbabwe (2009–2012), Deputy Assistant Secretary of Defense for POW and Missing Personnel Affairs (2006–2009), U.S. Ambassador to Cambodia (2002–2005)
 Julissa Reynoso, U.S. Ambassador to Uruguay (2012–2014)
 Thomas Robertson, U.S. Ambassador to Slovenia (2004–2008)
 James Rosapepe, U.S. Ambassador to Romania (1998–2001)
 Cathy Russell, U.S. Ambassador-at-Large for Global Women's Issues (2013–2017)
 Tom Schieffer, U.S. Ambassador to Japan (2005–2009), U.S. Ambassador to Australia (2001–2005)
 Dana Shell Smith, U.S. Ambassador to Qatar (2014–2017)
 Bob Sherman, U.S. Ambassador to Portugal (2014–2017)
 Nancy Soderberg, U.S. Ambassador to the United Nations for Special Political Affairs (1997–2001)
 Daniel V. Speckhard, U.S. Ambassador to Greece (2007–2010), U.S. Ambassador to Belarus (1997–2000)
 Charles Stith, U.S. Ambassador to Tanzania (1998–2001)
 Charles H. Twining, U.S. Ambassador to Cameroon and Equatorial Guinea (1995–1998), U.S. Ambassador to Cambodia (1994–1995), U.S. Ambassador to Benin (1982–1983)
 Marc M. Wall, U.S. Ambassador to Chad (2004–2007)
 Mary Warlick, U.S. Ambassador to Serbia (2010–2012)
 Joseph W. Westphal, U.S. Ambassador to Saudi Arabia (2014–2017), Under Secretary of the Army (2009–2014), Acting Secretary of the Army (2001)
 Lee S. Wolosky, U.S. Special Envoy for the Closure of the Guantánamo Bay Detention Facility (2015–2017)
 Mary Carlin Yates, U.S. Ambassador to Ghana (2002–2005), U.S. Ambassador to Burundi (1999–2002)

Defense Department officials 
 Deborah P. Christie, Assistant Secretary of the Navy for Financial Management and Comptroller (1994–1998)
 Richard Danzig, U.S. Secretary of the Navy (1998–2001), Under Secretary of the Navy (1993–1997)
 John W. Douglass, Assistant Secretary of the Navy (1995–1998)
 Frank Kendall III, Under Secretary of Defense for Acquisition and Sustainment (2011–2017)
 Susan Koch
 J. William Leonard, Director of the Information Security Oversight Office
 George E. Little, Assistant Secretary of Defense for Public Affairs (2012–2013)
 James N. Miller, Under Secretary of Defense for Policy (2012–2014)
 Robert B. Pirie Jr., Acting U.S. Secretary of the Navy (2001), Under Secretary of the Navy (2000–2001)
 Francis D. Vavala, Adjutant General of the Delaware Army National Guard (1999–2017)
 Andrew C. Weber, Assistant Secretary of Defense for Nuclear, Chemical, and Biological Defense Programs (2009–2014)
 Frank G. Wisner, Under Secretary of Defense for Policy (1993–1994), Under Secretary of State for International Security Affairs (1992–1993), U.S. Ambassador to India (1994–1997), U.S. Ambassador to the Philippines (1991–1992), U.S. Ambassador to Egypt (1986–1991), U.S. Ambassador to Zambia (1979–1982)

Justice Department officials 

 John P. Carlin, Assistant Attorney General for the National Security Division (2014–2016)
 James M. Cole, Deputy Attorney General (2010–2015)
 James Comey, Director of the Federal Bureau of Investigation (2013–2017), Deputy Attorney General (2003–2005) (former Republican, Independent since 2016)
 Sally Yates, Acting U.S. Attorney General (2017), U.S. Deputy Attorney General (2015–2017), U.S. Attorney for the Northern District of Georgia (2010–2015)

Other Executive Branch officials 
 Rand Beers, Acting U.S. Secretary of Homeland Security (2013), Acting U.S. Deputy Secretary of Homeland Security (2013), Under Secretary of Homeland Security for National Protection and Programs (2009–2013), Assistant Secretary of State for International Narcotics and Law Enforcement Affairs (1998–2002)
 Jake Braun, White House liaison to the Department of Homeland Security
 Richard Cordray, Director of the Consumer Financial Protection Bureau (2012–2017), 2018 nominee for Governor of Ohio
 Stuart Eizenstat, Director of the White House Domestic Policy Council (1977–1981), Deputy Treasury Secretary (1999–2001), U.S. Ambassador to the European Union (1993–1996)
 Alejandro Mayorkas, Deputy Homeland Security Secretary (2013–2016)
 Thomas O. Melia, Assistant Administrator of USAID for Europe and Eurasia (2015–2017)
 Elizabeth Sherwood-Randall, Deputy Secretary of Energy (2014–2017)
 John D. Trasviña, Assistant Secretary for the Office of Fair Housing and Equal Opportunity (2009–2014)

State and territorial executive officials

Governors

Current 

 Muriel Bowser, Mayor of the District of Columbia (2015–present) (governor-equivalent, previously endorsed Michael Bloomberg)
 Kate Brown, Governor of Oregon (2015–present); Oregon Secretary of State (2009–2015) 
 John Carney, Governor of Delaware (2017–present), U.S. Representative from DE-AL (2011–2017)
 Andrew Cuomo, Governor of New York (2011–present), U.S. Secretary of Housing and Urban Development (1997–2001)
 Ned Lamont, Governor of Connecticut (2019–present), 2006 nominee for Senate
 J. B. Pritzker, Governor of Illinois (2019–present)
 Gina Raimondo, Governor of Rhode Island (2015–present) (previously endorsed Michael Bloomberg)
 Gretchen Whitmer, Governor of Michigan (2019–present)

Former 

 Neil Abercrombie, Governor of Hawaii (2010–2014), U.S. Representative from HI-01 (1991–2010, 1986–1987)
 George Ariyoshi, Governor of Hawaii (1973–1986), Lieutenant Governor of Hawaii (1970–1974)
 Roy Barnes, Governor of Georgia (1999–2003)
 James Blanchard, U.S. Ambassador to Canada (1993–1996), Governor of Michigan (1983–1991), U.S. Representative from MI-18 (1975–1983)
 Ben Cayetano, Governor of Hawaii (1994–2002), Lieutenant Governor of Hawaii (1986–1994)
 Richard J. Codey, Governor of New Jersey (2004–2006), President of the New Jersey Senate (2002–2010)
 Chet Culver, Governor of Iowa (2007–2011), Secretary of State of Iowa (1999–2007)
 Jim Doyle, Governor of Wisconsin (2003–2011)
 James Florio, Governor of New Jersey (1990–1994), U.S. Representative from NJ-01 (1975–1990)
 Alejandro García Padilla, Governor of Puerto Rico (2013–2017)
 Jennifer Granholm, Governor of Michigan (2003–2011), Attorney General of Michigan (1999–2003)
 Christine Gregoire, Governor of Washington (2005–2013), Chair of the National Governors Association (2010–2011), Attorney General of Washington (1993–2005)
 Jim Hodges, Governor of South Carolina (1999–2003)
 Bob Holden, Governor of Missouri (2001–2005), Treasurer of Missouri (1993–2001)
 John Lynch, Governor of New Hampshire (2005–2013)
 Ray Mabus, Secretary of the Navy (2009–2017), U.S. Ambassador to Saudi Arabia (1994–1996), Governor of Mississippi (1988–1992) (previously endorsed Kamala Harris)
 Jack Markell, Governor of Delaware (2009–2017), Chair of the National Governors Association (2012–2013)
 Terry McAuliffe, Governor of Virginia (2014–2018), Chair of the National Governors Association (2016–2017), Chair of the Democratic National Committee (2001–2005)
 Bob Miller, Governor of Nevada (1989–1999), Chair of the National Governors Association (1989–1999)
 Jay Nixon, Governor of Missouri (2009–2017), 1998 and 1988 nominee for Senate (previously endorsed Michael Bloomberg)
 Martin O'Malley, Governor of Maryland (2007–2015), 2016 candidate for president (previously endorsed Beto O'Rourke)
 Deval Patrick, Governor of Massachusetts (2007–2015), 2020 candidate for president
 Pat Quinn, Governor of Illinois (2009–2015), Lieutenant Governor of Illinois (2003–2009), Treasurer of Illinois (1991–1995)
 Ed Rendell, Governor of Pennsylvania (2003–2011), Chair of the National Governors Association (2008–2009), General Chair of the Democratic National Committee (1999–2001)
 Roy Romer, Governor of Colorado (1987–1999), General Chair of the Democratic National Committee (1997–1999), Chair of the National Governors Association (1992–1993), 1966 nominee for Senate
 Peter Shumlin, Governor of Vermont (2011–2017)
 Ted Strickland, Governor of Ohio (2007–2011), 2016 nominee for Senate, U.S. Representative from OH-6 (1997–2007, 1993–1995) (previously endorsed Jay Inslee)
 John D. Waihe'e III, Governor of Hawaii (1986–1994), Lieutenant Governor of Hawaii (1982–1986)

Lieutenant Governors

Current 

 Susan Bysiewicz, Lieutenant Governor of Connecticut (2019–present)
 Garlin Gilchrist, Lieutenant Governor of Michigan (2019–present)
 Kate Marshall, Lieutenant Governor of Nevada (2019–present)
 Daniel McKee, Lieutenant Governor of Rhode Island (2015–present)

Former 

 Doug Chin, Lieutenant Governor of Hawaii (2018), Attorney General of Hawaii (2015–2018)
 Barbara O'Brien, Lieutenant Governor of Colorado (2007–2011) 
 Thomas P. O'Neill III, Lieutenant Governor of Massachusetts (1975–1983)
 Shan Tsutsui, Lieutenant Governor of Hawaii (2012–2018)
 Fran Ulmer, Lieutenant Governor of Alaska (1994–2002), 2002 nominee for Governor of Alaska, Mayor of Juneau (1983–1985)

Secretaries of State

Current 

 Alex Padilla, Secretary of State of California (2015–present) (previously endorsed Kamala Harris)
 Jesse White, Secretary of State of Illinois (1999–present)

Former 

 Robin Carnahan, Secretary of State of Missouri (2005–2013), 2010 nominee for Senate
 John P. McDonough, Secretary of State of Maryland (2008–2015)

Attorneys General

Current 

 Brian Frosh, Attorney General of Maryland (2015–present)
 Kathy Jennings, Attorney General of Delaware (2019–present)
 Tom Miller, Attorney General of Iowa (1995–present, 1979–1991) (previously endorsed Steve Bullock)
 Kwame Raoul, Attorney General of Illinois (2019–present)
 Josh Shapiro, Attorney General of Pennsylvania (2017–present)
 Phil Weiser, Attorney General of Colorado (2019–present); 15th Dean of the University of Colorado Law School (2011–2016)

Former 

 Bonnie Campbell, Attorney General of Iowa (1991–1995), 1994 nominee for Governor of Iowa
 Rufus Edmisten, Attorney General of North Carolina (1974–1984), Secretary of State of North Carolina (1989–1996), 1984 nominee for Governor of North Carolina
 Drew Edmondson, Attorney General of Oklahoma (1995–2011), 2018 nominee for Governor of Oklahoma

Other statewide officials

Current

 Nikki Fried, Agriculture Commissioner of Florida (2019–present)
 Nicole Galloway, 2020 candidate for Governor of Missouri, Auditor of Missouri (2015–present)
 Fiona Ma, Treasurer of California (2019–present)
 Susana Mendoza, Comptroller of Illinois (2016–present)
 Joe Torsella, Treasurer of Pennsylvania (2016–present), U.S. Ambassador to the United Nations for Management and Reform (2011–2014)
 Betty Yee, Controller of California (2015–present)

Former 

 Inez Tenenbaum, South Carolina Superintendent of Education (1999–2007), 2004 nominee for Senate

State and territorial legislative officials

State judicial officials

Former 

 John T. Broderick Jr., Chief Justice of the New Hampshire Supreme Court (1995–2004)
 Robert C. Hunter, Justice on the North Carolina Court of Appeals (1998–2014), North Carolina State Representative from District 49 (1980–1998)

Municipal and local officials

Mayors

Current 

 Steve Adler, Mayor of Austin, TX (2016–present)
 Stephen K. Benjamin, Mayor of Columbia, SC (2010–present) (previously endorsed Michael Bloomberg)
 Andy Berke, Mayor of Chattanooga, TN (2013–present)
 Ethan Berkowitz, Mayor of Anchorage, AK (2015–present), Member of Alaska House of Representatives from District 26 (2003–2007) and 13 (1997–2003), 2010 nominee for Governor of Alaska
 Rosalynn Bliss, Mayor of Grand Rapids, MI (2016–present)
 Keisha Lance Bottoms, Mayor of Atlanta, GA (2018–present)
 London Breed, Mayor of San Francisco, CA (2018–present) and Acting Mayor (2017–2018) (previously endorsed Kamala Harris, then Michael Bloomberg
 Luke Bronin, Mayor of Hartford, CT (2016–present)
 Aja Brown, Mayor of Compton, CA (2013–present) (previously endorsed Kamala Harris, then Michael Bloomberg)
 Mitch Colvin, Mayor of Fayetteville, NC (2017–present)
 John Cranley, Mayor of Cincinnati, OH (2013–present)
 Mike Duggan, Mayor of Detroit, MI (2014–present)
 Jenny Durkan, Mayor of Seattle, WA (2017–present), U.S. Attorney for the Western District of Washington (2009–2014)
 Buddy Dyer, Mayor of Orlando, FL (2003–present) (previously endorsed Michael Bloomberg)
 Greg Fischer, Mayor of Louisville, KY (2011–present) (previously endorsed Michael Bloomberg)
 Eric Garcetti, Mayor of Los Angeles, CA (2013–present)
 Robert Garcia, Mayor of Long Beach, CA (2014–present) (previously endorsed Kamala Harris)
 Andrew Ginther, Mayor of Columbus, OH (2016–present)
 Michael Hancock, Mayor of Denver, CO (2011–present)
 Lee Harris, Mayor of Shelby County, TN (2018–present), Tennessee State Senator for District 17 (2015–2018) and Tennessee Senate Minority Leader (2015–2018)
 Dan Horrigan, Mayor of Akron, OH (2016–present) (previously endorsed Tim Ryan, then Michael Bloomberg
 Lyda Krewson, Mayor of St. Louis, MO (2017–present)
 Sam Liccardo, Mayor of San Jose, CA (2014–present) (previously endorsed Kamala Harris, then Michael Bloomberg)
 Lori Lightfoot, Mayor of Chicago, IL (2019–present)
 María Meléndez, Mayor of Ponce, PR (2009–present)
 Ken Miyagishima, Mayor of Las Cruces, NM (2007–present) (previously endorsed Michael Bloomberg)
 Andre Quintero, Mayor of El Monte, CA (2009–present)
 José Román Abreu, Mayor of San Lorenzo, PR (2001–present)
 Darrell Steinberg, Mayor of Sacramento, CA (2016–present) (previously endorsed Kamala Harris)
 Levar Stoney, Mayor of Richmond, VA (2017–present), Secretary of the Commonwealth (2014–2016)
 Michael Taylor, Mayor of Sterling Heights, MI (2015–present) (Republican)
 John Tecklenburg, Mayor of Charleston, SC (2016–present)
 Nelson Torres Yordán, Mayor of Guayanilla, PR (2016–present)
 Sylvester Turner, Mayor of Houston, TX (2016–present) (previously endorsed Michael Bloomberg)
 Victoria Woodards, Mayor of Tacoma, WA (2018–Present) 
 Randall Woodfin, Mayor of Birmingham, AL (2017–present) (previously endorsed Kamala Harris)
 Jack Young, Mayor of Baltimore, MD (2019–present)

Former 

 Robert A. Baines, Mayor of Manchester, NH (2000–2006)
 Ralph Becker, Mayor of Salt Lake City, UT (2008–2016) (previously endorsed Michael Bloomberg)
 Michael Bloomberg, Mayor of New York City, NY (2002–2013), 2020 candidate for president
 Bob Buckhorn, Mayor of Tampa, FL (2011–2019) (previously endorsed Michael Bloomberg)'''
 Pete Buttigieg, Mayor of South Bend, IN (2012–2020), 2020 candidate for president
 Michael Coleman, Mayor of Columbus, OH (2000–2016) (previously endorsed Kamala Harris, then Michael Bloomberg) John Cook, Mayor of El Paso, TX (2005–2013) (previously endorsed Michael Bloomberg) Peter Corroon, Mayor of Salt Lake City, UT (2004–2013) (previously endorsed Michael Bloomberg) Karl Dean, Mayor of Nashville, TN (2007–2015), 2018 nominee for Governor of Tennessee (previously endorsed Michael Bloomberg) Karen Freeman-Wilson, Mayor of Gary, IN (2012–2019) (previously endorsed Michael Bloomberg) Bill Gluba, Mayor of Davenport, IA (2008–2016)
 Phil Gordon, Mayor of Phoenix, AZ (2004–2012)
 Phil Hardberger, Mayor of San Antonio, TX (2005–2009)
 Jan Laverty Jones, Mayor of Las Vegas, NV (1991–1999), 1998 nominee for Governor of Nevada
 Mark Mallory, Mayor of Cincinnati, OH (2005–2013)
 Douglas Palmer, Mayor of Trenton, NJ (1990–2010) (previously endorsed Michael Bloomberg) Mike Rawlings, Mayor of Dallas, TX (2011–2019), CEO of Pizza Hut (1997–2002)
 Stephanie Rawlings-Blake, Mayor of Baltimore, MD (2010–2016)
 Joseph P. Riley Jr., Mayor of Charleston, SC (1975–2016)
 Michael Signer, Mayor of Charlottesville, VA (2016–2018)
 Mark Stodola, Mayor of Little Rock, AR (2007–2018) (previously endorsed Michael Bloomberg) Kathy Taylor. Mayor of Tulsa, OK (2006–2009) (previously endorsed Michael Bloomberg) Nelson Wolff, County Judge of Bexar County, TX (2001–present), Mayor of San Antonio, TX (1991–1995) (previously endorsed Julian Castro)Other municipal officials 
 Current 

 Jackie Lacey, District Attorney of Los Angeles County (2012–present)

Local legislators
Current

 Frank Baker, Boston City Council (2011–present)
 Paul Koretz, Los Angeles City Council (2009–present)

Party officials
DNC members
Current

 Lindy Li, Women's Co-Chair and Mid-Atlantic Regional Chair at the Democratic National Committee
 Bob Mulholland, member of the Democratic National Committee, senior advisor, California Democratic Party (previously endorsed Kamala Harris) Henry R. Muñoz III, DNC member and Finance Chair of the Democratic National Committee (2017–2019)
 Symone Sanders, member of the Democratic National Committee, political commentator, national press secretary for the Bernie Sanders 2016 presidential campaign, and Senior Advisor for Joe Biden 2020 presidential campaign

Former

 Mannie Rodriguez, DNC member

State party chairs
Former

 Chip Forrester, Chair of the Tennessee Democratic Party (2009–2013)
 Wayne Holland, Chair of the Utah Democratic Party (2005–2011), President of United Steelworkers District 12 (2019–present)
 Steve Kerrigan, CEO of the DNC (2009–2012)
 Bob Tuke, Chair of the Tennessee Democratic Party (2005–2007), 2008 nominee for Senate
 David Young, Chair of the North Carolina Democratic Party (2009–2011)

Other 2020 statewide candidates

 Mark Kelly, 2020 Arizona candidate (and eventual winner) for Senate, former astronaut
 Amy McGrath, 2020 Kentucky candidate for Senate, 2018 nominee for KY-6

Notable individuals
Academics and scholars
 Philip Bobbitt, Herbert Wechsler Professor of Jurisprudence at Columbia Law School
 Daniel Byman, Senior Associate Dean at the Georgetown University Walsh School of Foreign Service
 Oona A. Hathaway, Gerard C. and Bernice Latrobe Smith Professor of International Law at Yale Law School

Activists and public figures

 Jill Biden, educator, Second Lady of the United States (2009–2017), Biden's wife
 George Conway, attorney, anti-Trump critic (former Republican before 2018, now Independent) Chad Griffin, founder of American Foundation for Equal Rights, former President of Human Rights Campaign (2012–2019)
 Fred Guttenberg, anti-gun violence activist and father of Jaime Guttenberg
 Victoria Reggie Kennedy, attorney, widow of Senator Ted Kennedy
 Khizr Khan, father of U.S. Army Captain Humayun Khan
 Lilly Ledbetter, equal pay for equal work activist and lead plaintiff in the landmark employment discrimination  Supreme Court case, Ledbetter v. Goodyear Tire & Rubber Co.; namesake of the Lilly Ledbetter Fair Pay Act of 2009
 Jim Obergefell, lead plaintiff in landmark civil rights Supreme Court case Obergefell v. Hodges Greg Schultz, Special Assistant to the President (2013–2017) and Senior Advisor to Biden's campaign
 Mac Stipanovich, political activist and strategist (Republican) Chesley "Sully" Sullenberger, former U.S. Air Force pilot and US Airways captain (former Republican)
 Christie Vilsack, First Lady of Iowa (1999–2007), 2012 nominee for IA-4

Athletes and sports figures

 Michelle Kwan, two-time Olympic medalist in figure skating
 Brandon Lloyd, former NFL First Team All-Pro Wide Receiver (2003–2014) 

Business executives and leaders

 Peter Chernin, Chairman and CEO of The Chernin Group
 David L. Cohen, senior executive vice president of Comcast
 Mark Gallogly, managing principal and founder of Centerbridge Partners
 Jim Gianopulos, CEO of Paramount Pictures
 Jonathan D. Gray, COO of The Blackstone Group, Chairman of Hilton Worldwide
 Daniel J. Hilferty, CEO of Independence Blue Cross
 Jeffrey Katzenberg, co-founder and CEO of DreamWorks Animation and DreamWorks Records
 Michael Kempner, founder and CEO of MWWPR
 Sherry Lansing, former CEO of Paramount Pictures
 Jackie Norris, CEO of Goodwill of the Heartland
 Amy Pascal, former Chair of Sony Pictures Motion Picture Group
 Anna Wintour, journalist, editor-in-chief of Vogue
 Andrew Yang, founder of Venture for America, 2020 candidate for president

Entertainers and artists

 Alec Baldwin, actor, producer, writer, comedian and political activist
 Michael Bivins, singer, rapper, producer, and founding member of New Edition
 Michael Ian Black, comedian, actor, writer, and director.
 Dustin Lance Black, screenwriter, director, producer, and activist
 Cher, singer and actress, nicknamed the Goddess of Pop
 Leonardo DiCaprio, actor
 Vivica A. Fox, actress, producer, television host
 Tom Hanks, actor and filmmaker
 Keegan-Michael Key, actor, comedian
 Jay Leno, comedian, actor, writer, producer, and former host of The Tonight Show with Jay Leno Jane Lynch, actress and comedienne
 George R. R. Martin, author, screenwriter, and television producer, creator of A Song of Ice and Fire Debra Messing, actress
 Alyssa Milano, actress and singer
 Rosie O'Donnell, comedienne, producer, actress, author, and television personality
 Kaitlin Olson, actress, producer and comedian
 Rob Reiner, actor, director, and writer
 Barbra Streisand, singer, actress, and filmmaker
 Sean Patrick Thomas, actor
 Lynn Whitfield, actress, producer
 Rita Wilson, actress, singer, songwriter, and producer

Union leaders

 Michael Mulgrew, President of the United Federation of Teachers (2009–present)

Organizations
Activist groups

 Brady Campaign
 Everytown for Gun Safety
 National Wildlife Federation

Labor unions
 Amalgamated Transit Union, representing 200,000
American Federation of State, County, and Municipal Employees, representing 1.3 million
 American Federation of Teachers, representing 1.7 million
 International Association of Bridge, Structural, Ornamental, and Reinforcing Iron Workers, representing 130,000
 International Association of Fire Fighters, representing 313,000
 International Association of Machinists and Aerospace Workers, representing 570,000
 International Brotherhood of Electrical Workers, representing 725,000
 International Longshoremen's Association, representing 65,000
 National Association of Government Employees, representing over 100,000
 National Education Association, representing 3 million
 United Food and Commercial Workers Local 1776, representing 20,000
 United Food and Commercial Workers, representing 1.3 million

Newspapers

 Chicago Sun-Times Detroit Free Press The Detroit News Las Vegas Sun (co-endorsement with Amy Klobuchar) Las Vegas Weekly (co-endorsement with Amy Klobuchar) The Palm Beach PostThe San Diego Union-Tribune (previously endorsed Pete Buttigieg) Sioux City Journal Sun Sentinel Wisconsin State JournalPolitical organizations
 BOLD PAC 
 Michigan Democratic Party Black Caucus (previously endorsed Kamala Harris)''

See also
 Endorsements in the 2020 Democratic Party presidential primaries
 News media endorsements in the 2020 United States presidential primaries
 List of Bernie Sanders 2020 presidential campaign endorsements
 List of Donald Trump 2020 presidential campaign endorsements

References

External links

 Official website

2020-related lists
Biden
Endorsements
Biden, Joe